The Tetrahedron Prize for Creativity in Organic Chemistry or Bioorganic and Medicinal Chemistry is awarded annually by Elsevier, the publisher of Tetrahedron Publications. It was established in 1980 and named in honour of the founding co-chairmen of these publications, Professor Sir Robert Robinson and Professor Robert Burns Woodward. The prize consists of a gold medal, a certificate, and a monetary award of US $15,000.

Prizewinners
Winners of the prize are:

See also

 List of chemistry awards

References

Awards established in 1981
British science and technology awards
Chemistry awards